Constructive treason is the judicial extension of the statutory definition of the crime of treason. For example, the English Treason Act 1351 declares it to be treason "When a Man doth compass or imagine the Death of our Lord the King". This was subsequently interpreted by the courts to include imprisoning the king, on the ground that history had shown that when a king is held captive by a usurper, he often dies in captivity. Despite legislative efforts to restrict the scope of treason, judges and prosecutors in common law jurisdictions still succeeded in broadening the reach of the offence by "constructing" new treasons. It is the opinion of one legal historian that:

England and Great Britain

Ironically, the first attempt to constrain the development of constructive treasons in England was the 1351 Act itself. Its preamble states that Parliament had decided to define treason by statute for the first time because the common law definition had expanded so widely (however this had not been constructive treason, since until 1351 treason had always been defined by judges, not by legislation). The Act ended with a clause which prohibited further judicial development of the offence:

As noted above, this was not entirely successful. From the seventeenth century, English courts refined and extended the law of treason, tolerated by Parliament, which sometimes even enshrined these new constructive treasons in new statutes – imprisoning the king became written into the Treason Acts of 1661 and 1795. By the nineteenth century, however, Parliament had established itself as the main source of new crimes, as the volume of legislation increased, and the ancient common law tradition of judges creating new crimes fell into disuse.

United States

The United States inherited the English common law from the British Empire, and the Founding Fathers recognised the danger of what James Madison called "new-fangled and artificial treasons". Therefore, they intentionally drafted the treason clause of the US Constitution narrowly:

This avoided vague words like "compassing or imagining" which had given British judges and lawyers such latitude. The words "giving them aid and comfort" were added by the Committee of Detail to further narrow the definition of treason. This was done not only to prevent judges from constructing new treasons, but also to prevent Congress from enacting new ones.

The constitutional definition did not immediately deter prosecutors from attempting to prosecute for levying war people who had not directly done so. However the Supreme Court resisted efforts to construe the definition more widely than its text appeared to allow. In Ex parte Bollman (1807) the Supreme Court rejected arguments by prosecutors to the effect that enlisting an army of men against the United States could amount to levying war before they actually assembled. Chief Justice Marshall held: "The mere enlisting of men, without assembling them, is not levying war." In United States v. Burr the Court held that mere intent to commit treason was not sufficient either. Subsequent cases have concentrated on evidential requirements for proving treason, rather than definitions of substantive crimes.

Another example appears in Cramer v. United States (1945), which dealt with Section 1 of the Criminal Code:  Which eventually ended with the clarification of the United States definition of treason.

See also
Trial of Lord George Gordon
Cramer v. United States

Notes and references

Treason